Skynd is a crater on the surface of Uranus' moon Umbriel. It is estimated to be between 72 and 110 km in diameter.

Skynd has a bright central or near central peak, which is one of the few bright albedo features on Umbriel that noticeably stands out against Umbriel's low albedo.

The crater is named after Skynd, a troll who stole three wives of a man living in Englerup.

References 

Citations

Sources

 
 

Impact craters on Uranus' moons
Umbriel (moon)